The men's cross-country competition at the 2010 Asian Games in Guangzhou was held on 18 November at the Dafushan Mountain Bike Course. The race was 43.2 kilometers long and began with a mass start. and involved eight laps around the 5.4 kilometers.

Schedule
All times are China Standard Time (UTC+08:00)

Results 
Legend
DNF — Did not finish

References

External links 
Results
Results

Mountain Men